The Iroquois women's national lacrosse team represents the Iroquois Confederacy in international women's lacrosse competitions. They are currently ranked twelfth in the world by the World Lacrosse.

The first Haudenosaunee female team in 18 years was organized and competed in the 2005 Cup of Nations lacrosse festival.  The "First Nations" team was composed of 15- to 18-year-olds and was one of eight international teams.  The following year, a women's Iroquois team stood in front of the Six Nations Confederacy Council asking for permission to field an international lacrosse team.

In 2008, the Iroquois Confederacy women's team, under the name Haudenosaunee, became a full member of the World Lacrosse. In 2021, the Haudenosaunee Nationals organization was disbanded and the women's team was rebranded under the Iroquois Nationals organization. In June of 2022, the Nationals dropped Iroquois from their name, adopting the name the Haudenosaunee Nationals.

Woman's Lacrosse World Cup

Overall results

2009

2013

2017

2022

World Games

Overall results

2022

Other tournaments and games

1980s

2000s

2010s

2020s

References

Lacrosse of the Iroquois Confederacy
National lacrosse teams
National sports teams of the Iroquois Confederacy
Women's lacrosse teams
Native American women
First Nations sportspeople
Women's lacrosse in Canada